Mount Carmel Health System is the second-largest health care system in central Ohio.  They employ over 8,000 employees and 1,500 doctors in their numerous outpatient facilities and their four hospitals: Mount Carmel East near Reynoldsburg, Mount Carmel Grove City in Grove City, Mount Carmel St. Ann's in Westerville, and Mount Carmel New Albany Surgical Hospital in New Albany. Mount Carmel also operates the Medicare Advantage plan MediGold. It is the second largest member of Trinity Health.

Mount Carmel formerly operated Mount Carmel West in Franklinton, from 1886 to 2019.

In August 2016, Adeptus Health reached an agreement with the Mount Carmel Health System to build and operate emergency rooms in Ohio under the Mount Carmel brand.

Columbus CyberKnife Center
Columbus CyberKnife is a facility specializing in stereotactic body radiation therapy cancer treatment. The center treats malignant and benign tumors in the kidney, brain, eye, liver, pancreas, lung, spine and prostate, using CyberKnife technology.

Columbus CyberKnife opened in 2010 as a service of the system's Mount Carmel St. Ann's Hospital in Westerville, Ohio. In addition to treating certain types of cancer, the center also treats trigeminal neuralgia, a neuropathic disorder that causes intense pain throughout the face. The CyberKnife delivers high dose radiation beams to the trigeminal nerve to treat the condition noninvasively.

References

External links
 Mount Carmel Health System homepage

Companies based in the Columbus, Ohio metropolitan area
Hospital networks in the United States
Healthcare in Columbus, Ohio
Medical and health organizations based in Ohio